Word Structure is an international academic journal covering linguistic morphology and all related disciplines. It is published twice-yearly, in April and October, by Edinburgh University Press and was founded in 2008 under the editorship of Laurie Bauer (Victoria University of Wellington), Heinz Giegerich (University of Edinburgh), and Gregory T. Stump (University of Kentucky).

The journal is both synchronic and diachronic and empirical and theoretical. It aims to understand the nature of words, particularly their morphology, syntax and phonology, as well as the social and psychological aspects of language, amongst others goals.

References

External links 

 

Linguistic morphology journals
Publications established in 2008
Biannual journals
English-language journals
Edinburgh University Press academic journals